Adhineta ( Leader) is a 2009 Indian Telugu-language political action film  produced by K. K. Radha Mohan on Sri Satya Sai Arts banner and directed by V. Samudra. Starring Jagapati Babu, Shraddha Das, Hamsa Nandini  and music composed by Srikanth Deva.

Plot
The film begins in a village where Suryanarayana / Suri Babu an unemployed youth who stands for righteousness. Puttaguntla Sriramulaiah a rectitude MLA is the preceptor of Suri Babu. He always insists Suri Babu be on board with politics which he denies. Then, with Sriramulaiah’s influence, Suri Babu joins as Personal Secretary to an amoral Chief Minister Tirupati Nayudu. In his tyranny, anarchy and irregularities flare in the direction of an anti-social element Mahendra Bhupati the sidekick to CM. Anyhow, in his rank Suri babu facilities the impoverished and acquires a good reputation in public. In that process, he aids financial support for a meritorious penniless student Rajeswari and they fall in love. 

Once, Mahendra Bhupati’s younger brother Narendra Bhupati bedevils with a girl Aasha sister of CM’s attender when Suri Babu kicks him off. In that rage, Narendra & his friends molest and slaughter Aasha. Suri Babu catches them with pieces of evidence and files up the case. But CM pull wires and drop the charges against the culprits. During that plight, Sriramulaiah starts a public agitation anti to CM which intensifies. So, Sriramulaiah is slain, and before dying, Sriramulaiah takes a word from Suri Babu that he will enter politics as his heir. Accordingly, Suri Babu contests as an independent from the Sriramulu constituency opposite CM's candidate Mahendra Bhupathi and triumphs. At this point, Suri Babu accumulates 25 independents which becomes deciding factor to form a government. Here Bharatamma wife of Sriramulaiah offers support to the party that makes Suri Babu CM. As it is a prerequisite Tirupati Naidu's party steps in and designates Suri Babu as Chief Minister of Andhra Pradesh. Therefrom, he makes many revolutionary changes in the governance that mobilizes a high level of public credence and applause. 

Parallelly, Tirupati Naidu & Mahendra Bhupati avenge their political failure. On the eve of Suri Babu & Rajeswari, they plot to assassinate him but tragically, his parents die in it. Enraged Suri Babu outbursts on Tirupati Naidu and challenges that the law will not spare him. Suri Babu forms a special team to uncover the diabolic shade of these brutal. Plus, he entrusts the charge to Inspector Hamsa Nandini who is favored by him to gain employment. On the verge of cracking the case, Hamsa Nandini is killed and all leads are smashed. Moreover, the knaves incriminate and apprehend Suri Babu as the homicide of Puttaguntla Sriramulaiah. As a result, he is dethroned and the government collapses. Now Suri Babu decides to establish a new party with new young candidates. He starts his campaign for ensuing elections from the prison which procures great response and glory. At last, he calls for a huge meeting Maha Garjana Sabha when the devil ruins to bar him. Yet, he successfully reaches the destination ceasing. Finally, the movie ends with Suri Babu announcing his party as Mana Desam and introducing a new system of Recall.

Cast

Soundtrack

Music composed by Srikanth Deva. The music was released on Aditya Music.

References

2009 films
Indian political films
Indian action drama films
Political action films
Films scored by Srikanth Deva
2000s Telugu-language films
Films directed by V. Samudra
2000s action drama films